Rödkallen is a small uninhabited (summer cabins are in use) Swedish island and lighthouse station located in the Bothnian Bay in the south part of Luleå archipelago. The island was used by fishermen a long time before the lighthouse was built. In 1800 a chapel was built for the fishermen and it survives to this day.

Lighthouse
The lighthouse was constructed after Nils Gustaf von Heidenstam's skeletal iron design. Originally it carried a colza oil lamp which was changed to a kerosene lamp 1884. In 1936 a small electric plant was built on the island which was used by the lighthouse. After one hundred years in service the old lighthouse was deactivated in favor of the small modern Rödkallen södra (south) light on the roof of a pilot station. The tall building has a yellow and red daymark. The station was closed down in 1981. A small hotel was started in the building in 2000, but it was closed in 2008. The old lighthouse is preserved and its large lens still mounted, covered with a shroud. In 2005 it was successfully tested for a while. On the island is also a couple of old stone mazes. Rödkallen is one of the many wind observation stations in the shipping news of the Swedish Meteorological and Hydrological Institute.

Important Bird Area
The island has been designated an Important Bird Area (IBA) by BirdLife International because it supports breeding populations of Caspian terns and black guillemots.

Climate
Rödkallen has a humid continental climate (Köppen Dfb) heavily influenced by its offshore position in a shallow and brackish sea surrounded by subarctic landmasses. It is also among the drier stations in Sweden. There is heavy seasonal lag in winter due to the formation of sea ice during the course of average winters. As the ice gradually melts in early spring, the island is sizeably cooler than the mainland during afternoons. This remains during summer, but then diurnal temperature variation lowers and the mild water keeps September above the  mark rendering it continental rather than subarctic.

During summer, lows in the single-digits are rare in spite of the high latitude. This is due to short nights being tempered by a mild body of water. In fact, many locations in the south of Sweden and on even lower European latitudes have cooler summer nights than Rödkallen. When the brackish water eventually freezes, temperatures plummet and sizeable cold waves can set in as the frigid air from the interior is no longer warmed up as it reaches the island. In spring, this can lead to strong cold snaps and ice days in April are quite common. The location is very sunny by Nordic standards and since it is quite a bit drier than where the Luleå sunshine station is located, it could potentially receive more sun than the municipal seat. In summer, there is perpetual twilight for a couple of months during night due to the high latitude. As a result, daylight is sparse in winter.

Rödkallen is a unique climate by Nordic standards for several factors. Due to the ice formation and recession, March is a lot colder than December and autumn is about  warmer in the afternoon than spring. It also has lower diurnals in summer than in winter, which is unusual on high latitudes. The temperature station was set up in 1961 but has several breaks since then, although it came back on a permanent basis in 1996.

See also

 List of lighthouses and lightvessels in Sweden

References

External links
 Sjofartsverket  
 The Swedish Lighthouse Society
 Picture of Rödkallen Södra
 Picture of the first Rödkallen lighthouse

Uninhabited islands of Sweden
Islands of Norrbotten County
Swedish islands in the Baltic
Lighthouses in Sweden
Buildings and structures in Norrbotten County
Important Bird Areas of Sweden
Seabird colonies